Andrea Figallo is an Italian vocal coach, vocalist and producer.

Career
Figallo has been involved for many years in the vocal a cappella music scene, teaching voice, coaching choirs, conducting, arranging, adjudicating vocal contests and holding workshops on many subjects: singing bass, vocal percussion, vocal group singing and all things vocal.

He a member of the Wise Guys (band) and the Flying Pickets. He's also founder of The Ghost Files, a vocal studio project dedicated to original vocal music recordings. He is a freelance conductor working all over Europe. From June 2012 to June 2013 he was the musical director of the choir don camillo chor, Munich.

His original choral music is published by Edition Ferrimontana GmbH and Helbling GmbH.

On 31 October 2012 he was introduced as the new bass singer of the German a capella band Wise Guys and successor of the former bass singer Ferenc Husta. Since the beginning of December 2012 he has been living in Cologne.

In February 2016, the Wise Guys made two important announcements: 1) the decision to disband in July 2017, 2) Andrea would leave the band two months later.

Figallo travels around the world teaching music, coaching choirs, producing recordings and adjudicating choral competitions.

Discography 
 Jazz'n Jam, Uno, Tape, 1996, singer, arranger
 Jazz'n Jam, Libera La Fantasia, CD, 1998, producer, singer, arranger
 Flying Pickets, Live in Hamburg, CD, 2001, producer, singer, arranger
 Flying Pickets, Vocal Zone EP, 2002, singer
 Flying Pickets, Everyday, CD, 2004, album producer, singer, arranger, recording engineer
 The Ghost Files, New Folder, CD, 2008, album producer, composer, singer, arranger, recording engineer
 Flying Pickets, Big Mouth, CD, 2008, producer, singer, arranger, recording engineer
 Esmeralda Grao, Sottovoce, CD, 2009, album producer, recording engineer, singer
 Bobby McFerrin, VOCAbuLarieS, CD, 2010, singer (3 Grammy Nominations)
 Flying Pickets, Only Yule, CD, 2010, producer, composer, singer, arranger
 Comedaccordo, CD, 2012, album producer, recording engineer
 Wise Guys, Antidepressivum single, 2013, producer, recording engineer, singer
 Bonner Jazzchor, Bottle This Moment, CD, 2013, album producer, singer
 Wise Guys, Achterbahn, 2014, producer, recording engineer, singer
 Wise Guys, Läuft bei euch, 2015, producer, recording engineer, singer
 Wise Guys, Live in Wien CD/DVD/Blu-ray, 2016, producer, arranger, singer
 Upsweep, Home, EP, 2017, producer, recording engineer, arranger
 Takarabune, Live in Kobe 2017, CD, 2017, producer, recording engineer
 Queen's Tears Honey, JUKEBOX Live From Kobe, CD, 2017, producer, recording engineer

Published vocal arrangements 
 Christmas Lullaby (Andrea Figallo), Helbling GmbH
 Shine (Andrea Figallo), Helbling GmbH
 She Walks In Beauty (Andrea Figallo), Helbling GmbH
 I Don't Know (Noa), Published by Edition Ferrimontana GmbH
 My Funny Valentine (Rodgers-Hart), Published by Edition Ferrimontana GmbH
 Letter from Home (Pat Metheny-Noa), Published by Edition Ferrimontana GmbH
 Watch Them Grow (Zach Gill), Published by Edition Ferrimontana GmbH
 I Can't Make You Love Me (Mike Reid, Allen Shamblin), Published by Andrea Figallo
 No Potho Reposare (Giuseppe Rachel, Salvatore Sini), Published by Edition Ferrimontana GmbH
 Dilly Dilly Baby (Figallo-Kamei), Published by Andrea Figallo
 What if (Figallo-Hüneke-Kamei), Published by Edition Ferrimontana GmbH
 Ti Vorrei Sollevare (Elisa), Published by Edition Ferrimontana GmbH

References

External links
 Andrea Figallo official website
 Wise Guys website
 The Ghost Files website
 Flying Pickets website
 don camillo chor website

1972 births
Living people
People from Gorizia
Italian male singers
Italian male conductors (music)
Italian music arrangers
Vocal coaches
The Flying Pickets members
21st-century Italian conductors (music)
21st-century Italian male musicians